Nerthus is a genus of seed bugs and allies in the family Heterogastridae. There are at least three described species in Nerthus, found in China and Southeast Asia.

Species
These three species belong to the genus Nerthus:
 Nerthus dudgeoni Distant, 1909
 Nerthus kempi Paiva, 1919
 Nerthus taivanicus (Bergroth, 1914)

References

External links

 

Lygaeoidea